Masterpiece of Bitterness is the second full-length album by Icelandic band Sólstafir, as well as their debut album with Spinefarm Records. It was released on 27 December 2005 on CD and later also on vinyl.

Track listing
 I Myself the Visionary Head – 19:58
 Nature Strutter – 9:26
 Bloodsoaked Velvet – 5:21
 Ljósfari – 8:58
 Ghosts of Light – 8:47
 Ritual of Fire – 14:32
 Náttfari – 3:16

References

2005 albums
Sólstafir albums